The Sky Digital brand is used in more than one country:
 Sky UK - Digital television service for the United Kingdom operated by BSkyB and for the Republic of Ireland operated by Sky Ireland.
 Sky Television (New Zealand) in New Zealand.